Aberdare Golf Club (Welsh: Clwb Golff Aberdar) is a golf club based just outside Aberdare at Rhondda Cynon Taf, Wales. It was founded in 1921 as a parkland course at Abernant, about a mile from Aberdare and is an 18-hole golf course famous for its mature oak trees. Dai Rees, who was former Ryder Cup Captain is a member and who started his career at the club as an Assistant Professional at the age of 16. This club has a "members only" policy.

References

Golf clubs and courses in Wales
Sport in Aberdare
Sports venues completed in 1921
1921 establishments in Wales